American Plan may refer to:

 American Plan, a 1918 U.S. program to combat venereal diseases, implemented by the Chamberlain–Kahn Act
 American Plan (union negotiations), a 1920s plan for refusing to negotiate with trades unions
 The American Plan, a 2009 play by Richard Greenberg
 American Plan, a term used by Sydney Brenner for a model of how brain cells determine their neural functions